Vladimir Aleksandrovich Lyovkin (6 June 1967 in Moscow) is a popular Russian singer, former member of the pop group  Na Na.  He was the main vocalist from the day of the band's foundation.

Biography

Early childhood he spent abroad, in Potsdam. After school, he entered the Moscow Power Engineering Institute, but training was interrupted by a summons to the military commissariat. Lyovkin served in the ship repair battalion near Murmansk. In the years of service, he played guitar in an army ensemble.

Returning from the Russian army, Vladimir entered Gnesinka.

As an experiment, decided to participate in the competition, organized by Bari Alibasov. So began his career in the group Na Na. In 1997 he acted in the video of Yevgeny Osin — Do not, Do not Cry. At the same time he had a disease —  a cancer of the lymphatic system. Treatment lasted 10 years. In the summer of 1998 the contract with Na Na comes to an end, and Vladimir leaves the group.

In 2000, Vladimir Lyovkin received an invitation from Vyacheslav Kachin   to the band Kedbl. Vladimir was the organizer, soloist, producer and manager of the group, but a serious illness forces the singer to leave the stage and permanently chained him to a hospital bed.

As of 17 December 2003, Vladimir was undergoing a complicated operation, as a result of which his health is on the mend. The singer returns to active stage and social life.

Since June 2006, Vladimir Lyovkin is engaged in social activities and is the director for culture of the public organization  Union of Social Justice of Russia.  Vladimir visits children's hospitals and medical centers, social shelters and orphanages.

References

External links
 Владимир Лёвкин  на peoples.ru
 Интервью для журнала  MAXIM: «Быть Владимиром Лёвкиным»
 Интервью для «Люберецкой газеты»: «В пустой голове мысли не рождаются»

1967 births
Singers from Moscow
Living people
20th-century Russian singers
21st-century Russian singers
Russian composers
Russian male composers
Russian pop musicians
Russian television presenters
20th-century Russian male singers
21st-century Russian male singers